2017 Thai League 4 Northern Region is the 9th season of the League competition since its establishment in 2009. It is in the 4th tier of the Thai football league system.

Changes from last season

Promoted clubs

Promoted to the 2017 Thai League 2
 Nong Bua Pitchaya

Four club was promoted to the 2017 Thai League 3 Upper Region.
 Kamphaeng Phet
 Phrae United
 Phayao
 Lamphun Warrior

Promoted from the 2016 Thai Division 3 Tournament Northern Region
 Changphueak Chiangmai

Relegated clubs

 Phetchabun were relegated to the 2016 Thai Division 3 Tournament Northern Region.

Relocated clubs

 Nakhon Sawan and Paknampho NSRU were moved from Central Region 2016

Renamed clubs
 Changphueak Chiangmai was renamed to JL Chiangmai United

Reserving clubs
Chiangrai United B is Chiangrai United Reserving this team which join Northern Region first time.

Teams

Stadium and locations

League table

Results 1st and 2nd match for each team

Results 3rd match for each team
In the third leg, the winner on head-to-head result of the first and the second leg will be home team. If head-to-head result are tie, must to find the home team from head-to-head goals different. If all of head-to-head still tie, must to find the home team from penalty kickoff on the end of each second leg match (This penalty kickoff don't bring to calculate points on league table, it's only the process to find the home team on third leg).

Season statistics

Top scorers
As of 9 September 2017.

Attendance

See also
 2017 Thai League
 2017 Thai League 2
 2017 Thai League 3
 2017 Thai League 4
 2017 Thailand Amateur League
 2017 Thai FA Cup
 2017 Thai League Cup
 2017 Thailand Champions Cup

References

External links
Thai League 4
 http://fathailand.org/news/97
 http://www.thailandsusu.com/webboard/index.php?topic=379288.0

4